Schlissel is a surname. Notable people with the surname include:

Dan Schlissel, American record producer and record-label founder (Stand Up! Records, -ismist Recordings)
David A. Schlissel, American energy consultant
Lillian Schlissel (born 1930), American historian, professor and author
Mark Schlissel, American academic
Yishai Schlissel, Israeli homophobic criminal